Envenomation is the process by which venom is injected by the bite or sting of a venomous animal.

Many kinds of animals, including mammals (e.g., the northern short-tailed shrew, Blarina brevicauda), reptiles (e.g., the king cobra), spiders (e.g., black widows), insects (e.g., wasps), and fish (e.g., stone fish) employ venom for hunting and for self-defense.

In particular, snakebite envenoming is considered a neglected tropical disease resulting in >100,000 deaths and maiming >400,000 people per year.

Mechanisms
Some venoms are applied externally, especially to sensitive tissues such as the eyes, but most venoms are administered by piercing the skin of the victim. Venom in the saliva of the Gila monster and some other reptiles enters prey through bites of grooved teeth. More commonly animals have specialized organs such as hollow teeth (fangs) and tubular stingers that penetrate the prey's skin, whereupon muscles attached to the attacker's venom reservoir squirt venom deep within the victim's body tissue. For example, the fangs of venomous snakes are connected to a venom gland by means of a duct.  Death may occur as a result of bites or stings. The rate of envenoming is described as the likelihood of venom successfully entering a system upon bite or sting.

Mechanisms of Snake Envenomation
Snakes administer venom to their target by piercing the target's skin with specialized organs known as fangs. Snakebites can be broken into four stages; strike launch, fang erection, fang penetration, and fang withdrawal. Snakes have a venom gland connected to a duct and subsequent fangs. The fangs have hollow tubes with grooved sides that allow venom to flow within them. During snake bites, the fangs penetrate the skin of the target and the fang sheath, a soft tissue organ surrounding the fangs, is retracted. The fang sheath retraction causes an increase in internal pressures. This pressure differential initiates venom flow in the venom delivery system. Larger snakes have been shown to administer larger quantities of venom during strikes when compared to smaller snakes. Snake envenomation events are usually classified as either predatory or defensive in nature.

Defensive envenomation events result in much larger quantities of venom being expelled into the target. Defensive envenomation can occur with 8.5 times greater venom flow rates and 10 times greater venom mass than predatory strikes. The need to quickly neutralize a target during a defensive strikes explains these higher venom quantities.

Predatory strikes are quite different than defensive strikes. In predatory strikes, the snake strikes and envenomates the target, and then quickly releases the target. Releasing the target prevents retaliatory damage to the snake or its venom delivery system. Once released, the target animal runs away until the venom induces death of the target. Snake venom has a scent that is easily recognized by the snake, allowing the snake to relocate its prey once it has run away and become deceased. While not all snake species in every situation release their prey after envenomation, venom generally assists in prey relocation. Venomous snakes have also been shown to be aware of the relative size of prey. Juvenile Rattlesnakes were experimentally shown to have the ability to adapt the volume of venom they expelled based on prey size. Once experienced, the juvenile Rattlesnakes consistently expelled more venom when attacking larger mice. This ability allows the snake to inject a sufficient quantity of venom to euthanize the prey while also conserving their venom supply for subsequent strikes. The economical use of venom is an important factor as it is a metabolically expensive resource.

Diagnosis and treatment
Diagnosing snake envenomation is a crucial step in determining which antivenom is to be applied. Each year there are around 2 million cases of snake envenomation and up to 100,000 deaths worldwide. Various anti-venom treatments exist, typically consisting of antibodies or antibody fragments, which neutralize the venom. Certain snakes require certain treatments, such as pit vipers and coral snakes. Anti-venom therapy is designed to treat the hemorrhaging and coagulation effects that venom has on humans.

See also
 List of venomous animals
 Toxicology

References

External links

Physiology
Toxicology